= Committee of Inquiry into the Arts and Disabled People =

Committee of Inquiry into the Arts and Disabled People was set up by the Carnegie Trust UK in 1982, and was the first comprehensive review in the UK evaluating the facilities available for disabled people to participate in the arts. It was chaired by Richard Attenborough. The report, known as the Attenborough Report, was published in 1985. It was discussed in Parliament in December 1986 and May 1987.
